The Pegaso 3560 BMR (Spanish acronym of "Blindado Medio sobre Ruedas", "Medium Armored on Wheels")  is a 6x6 wheeled armoured personnel carrier produced in Spain by Enasa since 1979.

Technical characteristics 
Originally powered by a Pegaso 9157/8 306 hp diesel engine, it has an automatic gearbox, torque converter, independent suspension in all six wheels and amphibious capability. It can also be transported by air.  It has received different kind of weapons throughout its life and there is also a field ambulance version.  As part of its optional amphibious equipment, it has two hydrojets for travel through water.

Pegaso BMRs are used by Spanish, Egyptian, Saudi Arabian, Moroccan and Peruvian Armies.

The Spanish Army BMRs (or BMR-600) have been instrumental in the performance of Spanish forces in international interventions in Yugoslavia, Afghanistan, Iraq and Lebanon.  In the last few years, all of them had their original Pegaso engines replaced by new 310 hp Scania DS9 61A 24S engines, as part of the "BMR 2" programme.  Furthermore, the vehicles were fitted with additional passive armour and an air conditioning unit.  They are now known as BMR M1.

Variants 

 BMR 3560.50 (BMR-PP) (Porta Personal) - Basic Armoured Personnel Carrier. Can be armed with machine guns, .50cal M2HB, 7.62mm MG1A1 or an automatic grenade launcher 40mm LAG-40.
 BMR EDEX (Equipo de Desactivación de Explosivos) - Version for Explosive Ordnance Disposal teams, with a higher roofline and special boxes to transport explosives.
 BMR C/C MILAN - Tank hunter with MILAN ATGM.
 BMR C/C TOW - Tank hunter with TOW ATGM.
 BMR VCZ (Véhiculo de Combate Zapadores) - Combat engineer vehicle with light bulldozer blade and winch.
 BMR VRAC-NBQ (Vehículo de Reconocimiento de Áreas Contaminadas) - Nuclear, Biological, Chemical, reconnaissance vehicle.
 BMR GEL (Guerra Electrónica) - Version fitted with specialised equipment for electronic warfare.
 BMR 3560.51 (BMR-PC) (Puesto de Control) - Command post vehicle.
 BMR 3560.53E (BMR-PM-81) (Portamortero) - Mortar platform with 81mm mortar LN M-86 and 100 rounds.
 BMR 3560.54 (BMR AMB) (Ambulancias blindadas ) - Ambulance.
 BMR 3560.55 (BMR-Recup) (Recuperación) - Light repair vehicle with crane, winch and tow bars.
 BMR 3560.56 - Signals vehicle.
 BMR 3560.57 - Tank hunter with HOT ATGM. Prototype.
 BMR 3560.59E (BMR-PM-120) (Portamortero) - Mortar carrier with 120mm mortar L-65.
 VMA (Vehículo Mecanizado Anfibio'') - With improved amphibious capabilities. Prototype.

Operators

Current operators 
 : 682
 : 260
 : 7 with the Mexican Marines. 
 : 20 (Marines)
 : 140 sold to the Royal Saudi Navy in 1983 and 300 locally produced.
 : 100

See also 
 Pegaso VEC BMR 3562.03
 List of armoured fighting vehicles by country

References

External links 

 BMR data (in Spanish)
 Santa Barbara's website

Armoured personnel carriers
Armoured fighting vehicles of Spain
Six-wheeled vehicles
Wheeled amphibious armoured fighting vehicles
Reconnaissance vehicles
Wheeled military vehicles
Military equipment introduced in the 1970s
Armoured personnel carriers of the Cold War